James Tomkins may refer to:

James Tomkins (MP) (c. 1569–1636), English MP for Leominster
James Tomkins (rower) (born 1965), Australian rower
James Tomkins (footballer) (born 1989), English footballer

See also 
James Tompkins (disambiguation)